JFK Declassified: Tracking Oswald is a History Channel television series about an investigation led by former CIA agent Robert Baer and former LAPD police lieutenant Adam Bercovici into the 1963 assassination of U.S. president John F. Kennedy, using recently declassified government documents to track down locations and witnesses connected with assassin Lee Harvey Oswald.

Episodes

Season 1 (2017)

In most countries, episodes 1-6 aired between April 25 and May 30, 2017. But, in the USA, episodes 3-6 were delayed until 16 September 2017. Then, after the additional 2,891 secret files came to light on 26 October 2017, Baer and his team examined them and presented updated findings in a follow-up episode - the seventh one - on 19 December 2017.

References

2017 American television series debuts
History (American TV channel) original programming
Television shows about the assassination of John F. Kennedy
2017 American television series endings